Bits and Bobs is a children's television programme which is produced and broadcast by the BBC. It still airs on CBeebies. The show is filmed at several notable Scottish attractions and locations.

Bits and Bobs also is English slang for a collection of small items too numerous or varied to name individually. It originated from carpenters' tool kits containing parts for a drill, with bits used for making holes while bobs are routing or screwdriving drill attachments.

Characters
Bits (voiced by Sally Preisig in series 1 & Rebecca Nagan in series 2)
Bobs (voiced by Lynn Robertson Bruce)
Trug (N/A)

Episodes

Series 1

Series 2

External links 
 Bits and Bobs at BBC.co.uk/CBeebies

2000s British children's television series
2002 British television series debuts
2005 British television series endings
BBC children's television shows
British preschool education television series
British television shows featuring puppetry
Television shows set in Scotland
English-language television shows
CBeebies
Television series by BBC Studios